MIMOSA (Micromeasurements of Satellite Acceleration), COSPAR 2003-031B, was a Czech scientific microsatellite. The satellite was nearly spherical with 28 sides and carried a microaccelerometer to monitor the atmospheric density profile by sensing the atmospheric drag on the approximated sphere.

MIMOSA was launched on June 30, 2003, alongside other miniature satellites including MOST and several CubeSat-based satellites. The satellite never became fully functional due to several technical problems on board. It is no longer in orbit. NORAD reported it burnt into the atmosphere on December 11, 2011.

See also

 2003 in spaceflight

References

External links
 Informative English page
 A free paper model of MIMOSA to download and build

2003 in spaceflight
Spacecraft which reentered in 2011
Spacecraft launched in 2003
Atmospheric sounding satellites
Space program of the Czech Republic